Altibox is a unified brand name for Broadband, IPTV and VoIP services distributed in Norway and Denmark with over 35 local Norwegian and 6 Danish FTTH networks. Altibox was set up by Southwestern Norwegian multi-utility firm Lyse Energi in 2002 under the name Lyse Tele. The company subsequently changed its name to Altibox in 2009.

Since 2002, the company has steadily been adding customers and distribution partners, with more than 360,000 homes connected. The vast majority of Altibox customers are self-install (over 80 per cent).

In 2016, Altibox became the sponsor and namesake of the Altibox Norway Chess Tournament, an annual event which has been called the strongest chess tournament in the world.

In December 2019, the company announced that it had bought all the shares in Skagenfiber, a provider of subsea cables from Norway to Denmark and Norway to Newcastle (UK).

References

External links
 Official site
 Arstechnica article
 Broadband TV news article

Telecommunications in Norway
Norwegian companies established in 2002